Bargaon is a census town in the Girwa tehsil of Udaipur district, Rajasthan, India. It has Dungla Tehsil towards East, Bhopalsagar Tehsil towards North, Mavli Tehsil towards North and Bhadesar Tehsil towards East.

Demographics
According to Census India 2011 data, the population of Bargaon is 91930, including 49080 males and 42850 females. According to same data, female sex ratio is 873, child sex ratio is 759 and literacy rate is 89.28%, including male literacy of 95.15% and female literacy rate of 82.69%.

References

Villages in Udaipur district